The new school of hip hop was a movement in hip hop music, beginning in 1983–84 with the early records of Run–D.M.C. and LL Cool J. Predominantly from New York City, it was characterized by drum machine-led minimalism, often tinged with elements of rock; rapped taunts, boasts, and socio-political commentary; and aggressive, self-assertive delivery. In song and image, its artists projected a tough, cool, street b-boy attitude. These elements contrasted sharply with funk and disco, novelty hits, live bands, synthesizers, and party rhymes of artists prevalent in the early 1980s. Compared to their older hip hop counterparts, new school artists crafted more cohesive LPs and shorter songs more amenable to airplay. By 1986, their releases began to establish hip hop in the mainstream.

The somewhat broader era of golden age hip hop is applied to late 1980s-to-early 1990s mainstream hip hop, characterized by diversity, quality, innovation and influence, and associated with Public Enemy, KRS-One and his Boogie Down Productions, Eric B. & Rakim, Ultramagnetic MCs, De La Soul, A Tribe Called Quest, and the Jungle Brothers, known for themes of Afrocentricity and political militancy, experimental music, and eclectic sampling. This period is sometimes referred to as "mid-school" or "middle school"; associated acts included Gang Starr, The UMC's, Main Source, Lord Finesse, EPMD, Just Ice, Stetsasonic, True Mathematics, and Mantronix.

The innovations of Run-D.M.C., MC Shan, and LL Cool J, and new school producers such as Larry Smith and Rick Rubin of Def Jam, were quickly surpassed by the Beastie Boys, Marley Marl and his Juice Crew MCs, Boogie Down Productions, Public Enemy, and Eric B. & Rakim. Hip-hop production became denser, rhymes and beats faster, as the drum machine was augmented with sampler technology. Rakim took lyrics about the art of rapping to new heights, while KRS-One and Chuck D pushed "message rap" towards black activism. Native Tongues artists' inclusive, sample-crowded music accompanied their positivity, Afrocentricity, and playful energy.  The new school/golden age ended with the eventual commercial dominance of West Coast gangsta rap, particularly the emergence of the relaxed sounds of G-funk by the early nineties, while the East Coast scene became dominated by hardcore rappers such as the Wu-Tang Clan and gangsta rappers such as Nas and The Notorious B.I.G.

The terms "old school" and "new school" fell into the vernacular as synonyms for "old" and "new" in hip hop, to the confusion and occasional exasperation of writers who use the terms historically. The phrase "leader of the new school", coined in hip hop by Chuck D in 1988, and given further currency by the eponymous group Leaders of the New School (who were named by Chuck D before signing with Elektra in 1989), remains popular.  It has been applied to artists ranging from Jay-Z to Lupe Fiasco.

Prehistory
Elements of new school had existed in some form in the popular culture since hip-hop's birth. The first MC's rapped over DJs swapping back and forth between two copies of the same record playing the same drum break, or playing instrumental portions or versions of a broad range of records. This part of the culture was initiated by  DJ Kool Herc in 1973  using breaks from James Brown, The Incredible Bongo Band and English rock group Babe Ruth in his block parties. Brown's music—"extensive vamps" in which his voice was "a percussive instrument with frequent rhythmic grunts", and "with rhythm-section patterns ... [resembling] West African polyrhythms"—was a keynote of hip hop's early days.  By 1975, Grandmaster Flash and Afrika Bambaataa had taken up Kool Herc's breakbeat style of DJing, each with their own accompanying rappers. Flash was especially associated with an important break known as "The Bells"—a cut-up of the intro to Bob James's jazz cover of Paul Simon's "Take Me To The Mardi Gras"—while Bambaataa delighted in springing occasional rock music breaks from records like "Mary, Mary", "Honky Tonk Women", "Sgt. Pepper's Lonely Hearts Club Band" and Grand Funk Railroad's "Inside Looking Out" on unsuspecting b-boys.

The earliest hip-hop records replaced the DJ with a live band playing funk and disco influenced tunes, or "interpolating" the tunes themselves, as in "Rapper's Delight" (Sugar Hill, 1979) and "King Tim III (Personality Jock)" (Spring, 1979). It was the soft, futuristic funk closely tied to disco that ruled hip hop's early days on record, to the exclusion of the hard James Brown beats so beloved of the first b-boys. Figures such as Flash and Bambaataa were involved in some early instances of moving the sound away from that of a live band, as in Flash's DJ track "The Adventures of Grandmaster Flash on the Wheels of Steel" (Sugar Hill, 1981), and even innovating popular new sounds and subgenres, as in the synthesizer-laden electro of Bambaataa's "Planet Rock" (Tommy Boy, 1982). Often though the rawer elements present in live shows did not make it past the recording studio.

Bambaataa's first records, for instance, two versions of "Zulu Nation Throwdown" (Winley, 1980), were recorded with just drums and rhymes. When Bambaataa heard the released records, a complete live band had been added. Something closer to his intentions can be heard on a portion of Death Mix, a low-quality bootleg of a Zulu Nation night at James Monroe High School in the Bronx, released without his permission on Winley Records in 1983. Likewise on the bootleg Live Convention '82 (Disco Wax, 1982), Grand Wizard Theodore cuts the first six bars of Rufus Thomas's "Do the Funky Penguin" together for five and a half minutes while an MC raps over the top. Grandmaster Flash's "Superrappin'" (Enjoy, 1979) had a pumping syncopated rhythm and The Furious Five emulating his spinbacks and needle drops and chanting that "that Flash is on the beatbox going ..." The beatbox itself however, a drum machine which Flash had added to his turntable set-up some time earlier, was absent on the record, the drums being produced by a live drummer.

Kool Moe Dee's verbal personal attacks on Busy Bee Starski live at Harlem World in 1982 caused a popular sensation in hip hop circles. In the same way, groups like the Cold Crush Brothers and The Force MCs were known for their routines, competitive attitude, and battle rhymes. Tapes of battles like these circulated widely, even without them becoming viable recordings. Apart from some social commentary like Melle Mel's one verse on "Superrappin'", Kurtis Blow's ruefully comedic "The Breaks" (Mercury, 1980) and a spurt of records following the success of Grandmaster Flash and the Furious Five's "The Message" (Sugar Hill, 1982), the old school specialized lyrically in party rhymes.

Advent

David Toop writes of 1984 that "pundits were writing obituaries for hip hop, a passing fad" which "Hollywood had mutated into an all-singing, all-dancing romance" in movies like Flashdance and Breakin'. Against this, Run-D.M.C., The Beastie Boys and the label Def Jam were "consciously hardcore", "a reaction against the populist trend in hip hop at the time", and "an explosive emergence of an underground alternative".  For Peter Shapiro,  Run-D.M.C.'s 1983 two-song release "It's like That"/"Sucker MCs" "completely changed hip-hop" "rendering everything that preceded it distinctly old school with one fell swoop." In a 47-point timeline of hip hop and its antecedents spanning 64 years, Shapiro lists this release as his 43rd point. Reviewing Toop's book in the LA Weekly, Oliver Wang of Soul Sides concurs, hailing Run-D.M.C. as inaugurating the new school of rap.

Run-D.M.C.

Run-D.M.C. rapped over the most sparse of musical backing tracks. In the case of "Sucker MCs", there was a loud, Oberheim DMX drum machine, a few scratches and nothing else, while the rhymes harangued weak rappers and contrasted them to the group's success. "It's like That" was an aggressively delivered message rap whose social commentary has been defined variously as "objective fatalism", "frustrated and renunciatory", and just plain "reportage". Run-D.M.C. wore street clothes, tracksuits, sneakers, one even wore glasses. Their only possible concession to an image extraneous to that of kids on the street was the stylistic flourish of black fedoras atop their heads. This stood in sharp contrast to the popular artists of the time, who had variously bedecked themselves with feathers, suede boots, jerri curls, and red or even pink leather suits.

The group's early singles are collected on their eponymous debut (Profile, 1984), introducing rock references in "Rock Box", and recognized then and now as the best album of hip hop's early years. The next year, they appeared at Live Aid and released King of Rock (Profile, 1985), on which they asserted  that they were "never ever old school". Raising Hell (Profile, 1986) was a landmark, containing quintessentially hip hop tracks like "Peter Piper", "Perfection" and "It's Tricky", and going platinum in the year of its release on the back of the huge crossover hit "Walk This Way". The group had rapped over the beat from the 1975 original in their early days, without so much as knowing the name of the band.  When Raising Hell's producer Rick Rubin heard them playing around with it in the studio, he suggested using the Aerosmith lyrics, and the collaboration between the two groups came about. The album's last track was "Proud To Be Black", written under the influence of Chuck D of the as-yet unrecorded Public Enemy. On "My Adidas" the band rapped that they "took the beat from the street and put it on TV".

Comments from Darryl McDaniels, AKA DMC of Run-D.M.C., make this connection to the underground explicit: "[T]hat's exactly what we did. We didn't really think it was pioneering, we just did what rappers did before us was doing on tapes. When a lot of the old guys, like Kool Moe Dee, The Treacherous Three, and Grandmaster Flash, got in the studio, they never put their greatness on records. Me and Run and Jay would listen ... and we'd say, 'They didn't do that shit last night in the Bronx!' ... So we said that we weren't going to be fake. We ain't gonna wear no costumes. We're gonna keep it real."

Def Jam
The other production credit on Raising Hell went to Run's brother, Russell Simmons; he ran Rush Artist Management, now Rush Communications, which as well as handling Run-D.M.C., managed the Beastie Boys, LL Cool J, Whodini and Public Enemy. Simmons also co-owned  Def Jam Recordings, an important new-school label, with Rubin. Simmons rose with Def Jam to become one of the biggest moguls in rap, while Rubin claimed credit for introducing radio-friendly brevity and song structure to hip hop. Def Jam's first 12-inch release was the minimalist drum machine breakdown "I Need A Beat" by LL Cool J (1984). This was followed by "I Can't Live Without My Radio" (Def Jam, 1985), a loud, defiant declaration of public loyalty to his boom box which the New York Times in 1987 called "quintessential rap in its directness, immediacy and assertion of self". Both were on his debut album for Def Jam, 1985's Radio (described as "Reduced by Rick Rubin" in its liner notes), which also contained the minimalist and rock-influenced track "Rock the Bells". Rubin also produced music for the Beastie Boys, who sampled AC/DC on their Rock Hard EP on Def Jam in 1984 and recorded a Run-D.M.C. outtake and a heavy metal parody on their hugely commercially successful debut album Licensed To Ill (Def Jam, 1986). In 1987, Raising Hell surpassed three million units sold, and Licensed to Ill five million. Faced with figures like these, major labels finally began buying into independent New York hip hop imprints.

Further development

The Juice Crew
One of hip hop's most important producers and innovators, Marley Marl found Cold Chillin' Records and assembled various hip hop acts, including MC Shan, Big Daddy Kane, Biz Markie, Roxanne Shanté, Kool G Rap & DJ Polo, and Masta Ace. His Juice Crew collective was an important force in ushering the "golden age" era of hip hop, with advances in lyrical technique, distinctive personalities of emerging stars like Biz Markie and Big Daddy Kane, and attaining crossover commercial success for hip hop music.

Marley Marl's first production was an "answer record" to "Sucker MCs" in 1983 entitled "Sucker DJs" by Dimples D. Soon after came 14-year-old Roxanne Shanté's answer to UTFO's "Roxanne Roxanne", "Roxanne's Revenge" (1985), sparking off the huge wave of answer records known as the Roxanne Wars. More disses (insults intended to show disrespect) from Shanté followed: "Bite This" (1985), "Queen of Rox" (1985), introducing Biz Markie on "Def Fresh Crew" (1986), "Payback" (1987), and perhaps her greatest record, "Have a Nice Day" (1987).

Boogie Down Productions
Shante's "Have a Nice Day" had aimed some barbs at the principal two members of a new group from the Bronx called Boogie Down Productions (BDP): "Now KRS-ONE you should go on vacation with that name soundin' like a wack radio station, and as for Scott La Rock, you should be ashamed, when T La Rock said "It's Yours", he didn't mean his name". Boogie Down Productions had manufactured a disagreement with the Juice Crew's MC Shan, releasing "South Bronx" and "The Bridge is Over" in reply to his "The Bridge" and "Kill That Noise" respectively.
KRS-One considered Run-D.M.C. the epitome of rap music in 1984 and had begun to rap following their lead. But he has also said that BDP's approach reflected a feeling that the early innovators like Run-D.M.C. and LL Cool J were by 1986 tainted by commercial success and out of touch with the streets.

Boogie Down's first album Criminal Minded (B-Boy, 1987) admitted a reggae influence and had KRS-One imititating the Beatles' "Hey Jude" on the title track. It also contained two tales of grim street life, yet played for callous laughs: "The P Is Free", in which KRS speals of throwing out his girl who wants crack cocaine in exchange for sex, and "9mm Goes Bang", in which he shoots a drug dealer then cheerfully sings "la la la la la la". Songs like these presaged the rise of an underground that matched violent lyrics to the hardcore drum machine tracks of the new school. The cover of Criminal Minded was a further reflection of a move towards this sort of radical image, depicting the group in a half-light, holding firearms. The next album By All Means Necessary (B-Boy, 1988) left that element behind for political radicalism following the murder of Scott La Rock, with the title and cover alluding to Malcolm X. KRS-One became involved with the Stop the Violence Movement at this time. Boogie Down Productions, along with Run-D.M.C. and Public Enemy, associated the new school as rap music with a strong message.

Eric B. & Rakim

Eric B. & Rakim appeared with the Marley Marl-produced "Eric B. Is President" and "My Melody" on Zakia Records in 1986. Both tracks appeared on Paid in Full (4th & Broadway, 1987). Just as B.D.P. had, the pair reflected changes in street life on their debut's cover, which depicted the two wearing huge gold chains and surrounded by money. Like Criminal Minded, the sampling prevalent in the album cemented James Brown's status as a hip hop source, while Rakim's allusions showed the growing influence of mystic Nation of Islam-offshoot The Nation of Gods and Earths in hip-hop.  The music was minimalist, austerely so, with many writers noting that coupled with Rakim's precise, logical style, the effect was almost one of scientific rigour.  The group followed Paid in Full with Follow The Leader (Uni, 1988), Let the Rhythm Hit 'Em (MCA, 1990) and Don't Sweat The Technique (MCA, 1992).

Rakim is generally regarded as the most cutting-edge of the MCs of the new school era.
Jess Harvell in Pitchfork in 2005 wrote that "Rakim's innovation was applying a patina of intellectual detachment to rap's most sacred cause: talking shit about how you're a better rapper than everyone else." Christgau in the Village Voice in 1990 wrote of Rakim's style as "calm, confident, clear. On their third album, as on their phase-shifting 1986 debut," he continues, "Eric B.'s samples truly are beats, designed to accentuate the natural music of an idealized black man's voice." Looking back at the late eighties in Rolling Stone in 1997, Moralez describes Rakim as "the new-school MC of the moment, using a smooth baritone to become the jazz soloist of mystic Afrocentric rap."

Public Enemy

Public Enemy, having been reluctantly convinced to sign to a record label, released Yo! Bum Rush the Show on Def Jam in 1987. It debuted the Public Enemy logo, which depicted a hatted b-boy in a sniper's crosshairs, and was replete with battle rhymes ("Miuzi Weighs a Ton", "Public Enemy #1"), social-political fare ("Rightstarter (Message to a Black Man)" and anti-crack messages ("Megablast").

The album was a critical and commercial success, particularly in Europe, unusually so for a hip hop album at that time. Yo! Bum Rush the Show had been recorded on the heels of Run-D.M.C.'s Raising Hell, but was held back by Def Jam in order for them to concentrate on releasing and promoting the Beastie Boys' License to Ill. Chuck D of Public Enemy felt that by the time their first record was released, BDP and Rakim had already changed the landscape for how an MC could rap. Public Enemy were already recording their second album It Takes a Nation of Millions to Hold Us Back (Def Jam, 1988) when Yo! Bum Rush the Show hit stores.

Gangsta rap

The underground sound centered on urban violence that was to become gangsta rap existed on the East Coast from soon after Run–D.M.C. had inaugurated the new school of hip hop. Philadelphia's Schoolly D self-released "Gangsta Boogie" in 1984, and "P.S.K. What Does It Mean?"/"Gucci Time" in 1985, leading to Saturday Night (Schoolly D, 1986, Jive, 1987). The West Coast, which became the home of gangsta rap, had Toddy Tee's influential Batteram mixtape in 1985, and Ice-T's "Six in the Morning" in 1986 before N.W.A's first records, leading to the hugely successful Straight Outta Compton in 1988.

Native Tongues
Developments in the New York new school continuum in this climate were represented by the Native Tongues groups—The Jungle Brothers, De La Soul, A Tribe Called Quest, Queen Latifah and Monie Love—along with fellow travellers like Leaders of the New School, KMD and Brand Nubian. They moved away from aggressive, macho posturing, towards ambiguity, fun and Afrocentricity. Their music was sample-crowded, more open and accessible than their new school predecessors. De La Soul's debut sampled everyone from The Turtles to Steely Dan, while A Tribe Called Quest matched tough beats to mellow jazz samples and playful, thoughtful raps.

Notes

a.  "A few weeks  ago I was DJing a party and a young twentysomething came up to me to request 'some old-school.' I asked for clarification – after all, Run DMC and LL Cool J are considered old-school, but technically, they invented the new school. The response: 'I don't know, some Tribe Called Quest or something.' After gently picking my jaw from off the floor, I turned back to my crates and wondered to myself, 'If Tribe is old-school, what does that make Kurtis Blow? In utero?'"—Oliver Wang, "Book report", San Francisco Bay Guardian, April 6, 2003.

b.  "I always get frustrated when I see a link to this site on some hipster's blog with a tagline like 'taking it back to the old school', when I very rarely post anything recorded before 1989. I mean, I guess a lot of what I post here is old, but that don't make it old school, yaoming? Like how you gonna call Leaders of the New School old school?"—Noz, "Lady Don't Tek No Beat", Cocaine Blunts and Hip Hop Tapes, January 10, 2005.

Endnotes

References
Cepeda, Raquel (ed.)  And It Don't Stop!, New York: Faber and Faber, Inc., 2004. 
Coleman, Brian. Check The Technique, 2nd. ed., New York: Villard, 2007. 
Cross, Brian. It's Not About a Salary ... , New York: Verso, 1993. 
Shapiro, Peter. Rough Guide to Hip Hop, 2nd. ed., London: Rough Guides, 2005. 
Toop, David. Rap Attack, 3rd. ed., London: Serpent's Tail, 2000. 

History of hip hop
American hip hop
African-American music
African-American culture